Piapot First Nation ( nêhiyaw-pwâtinâhk) is a Cree First Nation in southern Saskatchewan, Canada.

Reserves
 Haylands 75A
 Last Mountain Lake 80A
 Piapot 75
 Piapot 75E
 Piapot Cree First Nation 75F
 Piapot Cree First Nation 75G
 Piapot Cree First Nation 75H
 Piapot Cree First Nation 75I
 Piapot Cree First Nation 75J
 Piapot Cree First Nation 75K
 Piapot First Nation 75T
 Piapot Urban Reserve
 Treaty Four Reserve Grounds 77

References

 
Cree
First Nations in Saskatchewan